NGC 4561 is a barred spiral galaxy in the constellation Coma Berenices. It was discovered by William Herschel on April 13, 1784.

References

External links

Barred spiral galaxies
07768
Coma Berenices
4561
042020